The Official Monster Raving Loony Party (OMRLP) is a political party established in the United Kingdom in 1982 by the musician David Sutch, also known as Screaming Lord Sutch, 3rd Earl of Harrow, or simply Lord Sutch. It is notable for its deliberately bizarre policies and it effectively exists to satirise British politics, and to offer itself as an alternative for protest voters, especially in constituencies where the party holding a safe seat is unlikely to lose it.

History

Sutch era
Starting in 1963, David Sutch, head of the rock group Screaming Lord Sutch and the Savages, stood in British parliamentary elections under a range of party names, initially as the National Teenage Party candidate. At that time the minimum voting age was 21. The party's name was intended to highlight what Sutch and others viewed as hypocrisy, since teenagers were unable to vote because of their supposed immaturity while the adults running the country were involved in scandals such as the Profumo affair.

Sutch moved to America in 1968. After being shot during a mugging attempt while living in the United States, Sutch returned to Britain and to politics during the 1980s.  The Raving Loony name first appeared at the Bermondsey by-election of 1983.

A similar concept had appeared earlier in the Election Night Special sketch on the television comedy series Monty Python's Flying Circus, in which the Silly and Sensible parties competed; and a similar skit by The Goodies, in which Graeme Garden stood as a Science Loony. A Science Fiction Looney candidate had also competed in the 1976 Cambridge by-election.

Two others were important in the formation of the OMRLP: John Desmond Dougrez-Lewis stood in the Crosby by-election of 1981 (won by the Social Democratic Party's co-founder Shirley Williams); and Dougrez-Lewis stood in the by-election as Tarquin Fin-tim-lin-bin-whin-bim-lim-bus-stop-F'tang-F'tang-Olé-Biscuitbarrel, taken from the Election Night Special Monty Python sketch. He had changed his name by deed poll from John Desmond Lewis, on behalf of the Cambridge University Raving Loony Society (Curls), an "anti-political party" and charity fundraising group formed largely as a fun counter-response to increasingly polarised student politics in Cambridge. It was responsible for a number of fun stunts. Its Oxford University equivalents were the "Oxford Raving Lunatics". Dougrez-Lewis became Sutch's agent at the notorious Bermondsey by-election, where the OMRLP banner was first officially unfurled. Reverting to his original name, Dougrez-Lewis stood for the new party in Cambridge in the 1983 general election.

Another serial offbeat by-election candidate was Commander Bill Boaks, a retired World War II hero who took part in sinking the Bismarck. Boaks campaigned and stood for election for over 30 years on limited funds, always on the issue of road safety. Boaks proved influential on Sutch's direction as the leading anti-politician: "It's the ones who don't vote you really want, because they're the ones who think."

Boaks thought that increased traffic and more roads would cause problems, and he addressed road safety with flamboyant campaigning and a variety of tactics, including private prosecution of public figures who escaped public prosecution for drunk driving. He successfully campaigned with Sutch and others to pedestrianise London's Carnaby Street. While recovering from being struck by a motorcycle, Boaks was one of Sutch's counting agents at Bermondsey in 1983. Following Boaks's death, popular opinion towards road safety has become closer to his views.

Screaming Lord Sutch committed suicide on 16 June 1999 while suffering from clinical depression after his mother, Annie, died in 1998. A biography of Sutch, The Man Who Was Screaming Lord Sutch (by Graham Sharpe, the media relations manager of bookmaker William Hill), was published in April 2005, describing what remained of the party as "wannabes, never-would-bes and some bloody-well-shouldn't-bes".

Post-Sutch
Sutch's funeral – organised by his lifetime friend, the session drummer Carlo Little – was attended by members of the OMRLP and Raving Loony Green Giant Party, including Stuart Hughes, who with Freddie Zapp brought along a huge floral tribute shaped as an OMRLP rosette. The running of the OMRLP fell to Alan "Howling Laud" Hope and his cat, Catmando, who were the joint winners of the 1999 membership ballot for the replacement for Sutch. Although Hope took over as party leader after Sutch's death, the real day-to-day running of the party has always been done by other party members.

The OMRLP fielded 15 candidates in the 2001 general election, at which it had its best general election results to date.

The manifesto, entitled The Manicfesto, for the 2005 general election featured the major commitment of their long held pledge to abolish income tax, citing as always that it was only meant to be a temporary measure during the Napoleonic Wars. Also included was another old staple, the "Putting Parliament on Wheels" idea of having Parliament sit throughout the country rather than solely in Londonwith special emphasis this time in its creation negating the need for national/regional assemblies.

The OMRLP has fielded candidates since 2001, with reduced success and losing their deposits. "Top Cat" Owen is the only member of the current OMRLP to poll over 1,000 votes (he polled 2,859 votes in the 1994 European elections).

The OMRLP's official headquarters was originally the Golden Lion Hotel in Ashburton, Devon, then the Dog & Partridge pub at Yateley in Hampshire, but this was lost shortly after the 2005 general election. Conference venues are now chosen in advance: the 2006 conference was held at Torrington in Devon, and the 2007 conference was held in Jersey. The conference was held in Blackpool in 2017.

The party's last elected representative was R. U. Seerius (formerly Jon Brewer) on the 11 member Sawley Parish Council in South Derbyshire, first elected (uncontested) in 2005. He was no longer a member as of May 2007, having failed to appear in no fewer than 11 statutory meetings during his time in office, due to illness.

The OMRLP succeeded in standing in the two by-elections of 19 July 2007 in Sedgefield and Ealing Southall, but again achieving derisory results: Alan Hope acquiring 129 votes (0.46%) and John Cartwright taking 188 (0.51%), beating the English Democrats but coming behind the Christian Party of the Reverend George Hargreaves and David Braid.

In recognition that reforms were needed, Peter 'T.C.' Owen was moved from the honorary position of party chairman to that of deputy leader (and thus effective day-to-day leader) of the OMRLP, whilst Anthony "The Jersey Flyer" Blyth (owner of the Ommaroo and a member of the Jersey Heritage Trust) took over Owen's role. Owen is one of four Raving Loonies to have scored more than 1000 votes in an election.

On 31 May 2017 Hope was interviewed by Andrew Neil on the BBC's Daily Politics programme.

Electoral performance
In 1987, the OMRLP won its first seat on Ashburton Town Council in Devon, as Alan "Howling Laud" Hope was elected unopposed. He subsequently became deputy mayor and later mayor of Ashburton in 1998 (mainly opposed by the local Conservatives; they allegedly never forgave him for becoming a member of the OMRLP) until he moved to Hampshire after Sutch's death. For over a decade, his hotel The Golden Lion in Ashburton (referred to by some in the party as "The Mucky Mog") was the party's headquarters and conference centre.

The first party member to win a vote, rather than an uncontested election, was Stuart Hughes, taking the "safe" Conservative Party seat of Sidmouth Woolbrook on East Devon District Council in May 1991. He also took a seat on Sidmouth Town Council from the Conservatives the following day. His success was met with hostility from the local Tories. Hughes's reaction was to attempt to make their lives a misery for the next three years by refusing to pay his Community Charge (popularly known as the Poll Tax), then dumping scrap metal in the middle of the council chambers to the value of his unpaid tax when threatened with legal action. He also formed an alliance known as the Coastals (because of the seats they held) of Independents and the sole Green Party councillor, giving East Devon's ruling Conservatives the first true opposition they had faced for decades (the local Liberal Democrat and Labour parties being negligible).

Hughes retained his seats with increased majorities in subsequent elections, and took the Devon County Council seat from the local party's chief whip in the council. To date, two councillors have subsequently become mayors: Alan Hope in Ashburton in Devon and Chris "Screwy" Driver on the Isle of Sheppey in Kent.

At the Bootle by-election in May 1990, the Loony candidate (Sutch) received more votes than the candidate for the continuing Social Democrats. The story was a major headline in many UK newspapers; ironically, the by-election itself had attracted little coverage. Bootle is still regarded by the party as their most significant result in politics, albeit one largely lampooning the political world.

In the 2019 Brecon and Radnorshire by-election, the OMRLP candidate Lady Lily the Pink polled more votes than the United Kingdom Independence Party. The party got a record number of votes in the 2019 general election, when it polled 9,739 votes. Having fielded 24 candidates, this was, numerically, the party's highest vote at a general election. However, it has yet to improve on its best vote share of 0.1% at the 1992 general election.

The party has yet to save its deposit at a by-election, although the party's former leader, Screaming Lord Sutch, came close at the 1994 Rotherham by-election, winning 4.2% of the vote. The threshold for saving a deposit is 5%.

General elections

By-elections 
48th Parliament

49th Parliament

50th Parliament

51st Parliament

52nd Parliament

53rd Parliament

54th Parliament

55th Parliament

56th Parliament

57th Parliament

58th Parliament

Parish and town councillors
As of 2021, the party has seven parish and town councillors, one via the Molesey Residents Association.

2010 William Hill branding
For the 2010 general election, the OMRLP used the description "Monster Raving Loony William Hill Party", which was met with criticism by some members, with John Cartwright, Loony candidate in Croydon, publicly stating: "I am not and will not be a mercenary, or an advert, for a commercial company during the course of the election campaign."

Membership
The statement of accounts for the period 1 January to 31 December 2008 outlines membership at 1,354, made up of 173 paying members and 1,181 "lifetime but non-paying". It currently costs £12 per year for membership, which includes a party rosette, a certificate of insanity, a Loony badge, a party membership card and a letter from the party's leader. A £14.50 membership is available for those overseas.

Sir Patrick Moore (1923–2012), the British TV amateur astronomer, was the finance minister of the party for a short time. He once said that the Monster Raving Loony Party "had an advantage over all the other parties, in that they knew they were loonies".

In 1992, the Glasgow band Hugh Reed and the Velvet Underpants released the song "Vote Monster Raving Looney", despite not having any actual ties to the party.

Policies and electoral strategy
The OMRLP are distinguished by having a deliberately bizarre manifesto, which contains things that seem to be impossible or too absurd to implement – usually to highlight what they see as real-life absurdities. Despite its satirical nature, some of the things that have featured in Loony manifestos have actually become law, such as "passports for pets", abolition of dog licences and all-day pub openings.

Other suggestions so far unadopted included minting a 99p coin and forbidding greyhound racing in order to "stop the country going to the dogs".

The Loonies generally field as many candidates as possible in United Kingdom general elections, some (but by no means all) standing under ridiculous names they have adopted via deed poll. Sutch himself stood against all three main party leaders (John Major, Neil Kinnock and Paddy Ashdown) in the 1992 general election. Parliamentary candidates have to pay their own deposit (which currently stands at £500) and cover all of their expenses. No OMRLP candidate has managed to get the required 5% of the popular vote needed to retain their deposit, but this does not stop people standing. Sutch came closest with 4.1% and over a thousand votes at the 1994 Rotherham by-election, whilst Stuart Hughes still holds the record for the largest number of votes for a Loony candidate at a Parliamentary election, with 1,442 at the 1992 general election in the Honiton seat in east Devon. The all-time highest vote achieved was by comedian Danny Blue, who secured 3,339 votes in the 1994 European elections under the pseudonym of "John Major". Bamford had also acted as an election agent for Lindi St Clair's rival Corrective Party, and was a former close associate of Stuart Hughes.

In the run-up to the 2011 Alternative Vote referendum, the party adopted an equivocal stance, advising its supporters, on 8 April, to "vote as you see fit". In response to mainstream parties debating Brexit, the OMRLP suggested sending Noel Edmonds to the European Parliament "because he understands Deal or No Deal". It has advocated an "al dente Brexit" rather than a hard or soft Brexit.

In popular culture

Screaming Lord Sutch appeared as himself in the opening episode of television sitcom The New Statesman, standing for election in the seat of Haltemprice, which was won by Alan B'Stard for the Conservative Party. Sutch and his party polled second, ahead of Labour and the SDP.

The party's regular appearances at by-elections were satirised in the Blackadder the Third episode Dish and Dishonesty, with a candidate from the Standing at the Back Dressed Stupidly and Looking Stupid Party standing as one of Baldrick's rivals in a by-election held in a rotten borough.

A candidate was shown canvasing for a by-election on the One Foot in the Grave episode "I'll Retire to Bedlam" where a regional news programme filmed him knocking on the Meldrews' door. He explained the nature of the party, that they had some clearly set out policies, and that people could choose to vote for them as a protest vote; all while dressed vaguely as a bee. Later in the episode, another candidate for one of the major parties was shaking hands with patients in hospital, then came up to Victor to shake his hand and asked if Victor would be voting for him. Victor replied that he would be voting for the Monster Raving Loony Party and that he found their political platform the most sensible of all the major parties.

See also
List of frivolous political parties

References

Bibliography
 Life As Sutch – Lord David Sutch (ghost written by Peter Chippendale), Angus & Robertson 1991 (Expanded Edition 1992)

Further reading

External links

 

 
1983 establishments in the United Kingdom
Joke political parties in the United Kingdom
Political parties established in 1983